Willow Township is a township in Griggs County, North Dakota, United States.

History
The earliest record of Willow Township is a meeting of the supervisors held on March 29, 1887, at Johnson's Store, which is believed to have been located several miles east of Red Willow Lake.  Willow Township is believed to have been organized a year or two earlier.

Demographics
Its population during the 2010 census was 53.

Location within Griggs County
Willow Township is located in Township 148 Range 60 west of the Fifth principal meridian.

References

Townships in Griggs County, North Dakota